Isle Madame is an island off southeastern Cape Breton Island in Nova Scotia. It is part of the Municipality of the County of Richmond.

Once part of the French colony of Île-Royale, it may have been named for Françoise d'Aubigné, marquise de Maintenon. After the fall of Louisbourg in 1758, 4,000 inhabitants were deported. However, a group of 10 Acadian families from Port Toulouse fled to this Isle Madame where their descendants still live today.

It is separated from Cape Breton Island by the Lennox Passage, but connected by a causeway. The island is also connected by bridge to Petit-de-Grat Island, and by causeway and bridge to Janvrin Island.  Since 1994, the island has been served by a community television station, CIMC-TV, also known as Telile.

Isle Madame is home to approximately 4,300 residents located mostly in the island's communities of Arichat, D'Escousse, and Petit de Grat.

References

Islands of Nova Scotia
Landforms of Richmond County, Nova Scotia